The Iron King (German: Der Eisenkönig) is a 1923 Austrian silent film directed by Max Neufeld and starring Siegmund Breitbart, Eugen Neufeld and Georg Kundert.

Cast
 Siegmund Breitbart
 Eugen Neufeld as Sherriff, ein Gladiator
 Georg Kundert as Vater Breitbart, Schmied
 Karl Ehmann as Varieteedirektor
 Hanns Marschall as Pierrot
 Mizzi Griebl as Frau des Zirkusdirektors
 Ossi Breitbart as Prinz
 Manja Keller as Mutter Breitbart

References

Bibliography
 Elisabeth Büttner & Christian Dewald. Das tägliche Brennen: eine Geschichte des österreichischen Films von den Anfängen bis 1945, Volume 1. Residenz, 2002.

External links

1923 films
Austrian silent feature films
Films directed by Max Neufeld
Austrian black-and-white films